Guten Morgen, Herr Grothe (English: Good morning mister Grothe) is a 2007 German television film directed by Lars Kraume.

Plot
The 37-year-old, divorced Michael Grothe is a German teacher at a Berlin secondary school.  As an educator, he loves his job and is very committed to his students, which has had a negative impact on his private life.  His class is the most important thing for him;  The difficult Nico is most important to him, which is why the beginning relationship with his colleague Lisa Kranz suffers.  While others have long since given up on Nico, Grothe tries to support him, overstepping boundaries and putting himself and others in difficult situations.  Although he ultimately fails because of Nico, he still hopes that he has moved something in the students and brought them closer to personal responsibility.

Cast

 Sebastian Blomberg - Michael Grothe 
 Ludwig Trepte - Nico Brock
 Nina Kunzendorf - Lisa Kranz
 Mehmed-Azad Subasi - Emran
 Jacob Lemberg - Lars
 Ngoc Tu Nguyen - Duc
 Esra Kanaat - Sebiya
 Şafak-Şirin Ağdasan - Büsra
 Dominik Sierpowski - Schleimi
 Philip Jahn - Turtok
 Rebecca Martin - Jennifer 
 Stanislav Martsch - Yuri
 Cécile Remy - Laura
 Steffi Kühnert - Mrs. Brock, Nico's Mother
 Nele Mueller-Stöfen - Sibylle Grothe
 Gideon Finimento - Ruben Grothe

External links 

German television films
2007 television films
2007 films
German films